Atlantochelys is an extinct genus of sea turtle from the Upper Cretaceous of New Jersey. For 163 years, only a partial humerus was known, but the second part of the same bone was found in 2012. The full size has been extrapolated as being .

References

Late Cretaceous turtles of North America
Protostegidae
Prehistoric turtle genera
Fossil taxa described in 1849
Taxa named by Louis Agassiz